Sir Herbert Phillips OBE,  KCMG, (1878-1957) was a British diplomat who served in China.  His last position before retirement from government service was as British Consul-General in Shanghai.

Career
 
Phillips was born on 8 July 1878.

Phillips joined the British China consular service as a student interpreter in 1898.  In 1900, Phillips was appointed a 2nd Class Assistant and in 1903 appointed Acting Vice Consul in Tientsin (now Tianjin). In 1904, he acted as Chief Clerk and Registrar of the British Supreme Court for China and Corea.  He was promoted to First Class Assistant in 1906 and served as Acting Vice Consul in Chungking from December 1907 to April 1909. He was appointed Acting Chinese Secretary of the British Legation in Peking in 1910. He was promoted to Vice Consul in 1911 and was appointed Consul in Wuchow.  He did not take up the position going instead to Shanghai as consul in 1913.  He was called to the bar of the Middle Temple in 1914.  

Between 1919 and 1925 Phillips served as consul in Newchwang (now Yingkou), Foochow (now Fuzhou) and Harbin. He was appointed Inspector-General of Consular Establishments in the Far East with the personal rank of Consul General in 1925 and then served as consul general in Nanking (although based in Shanghai) and then in Canton from February 1930. He was transferred as consul-general to Shanghai 1937.

Awards and decorations

Phillips received the China Medal in 1900. 

He was awarded an OBE in 1918 and made a CMG in 1927. He was knighted (KCMG) in 1938.

Retirement and death

Phillips retired from consular service in January 1940 and returned to England. He died in Henley-on-Thames on 27 March 1957.

Further reading
 , Vol. 1: ; Vol. 2: ; Vol. 3:

References

1878 births
1957 deaths
British diplomats
British extraterritorial judges
British diplomats in China
Companions of the Order of St Michael and St George
Members of the Middle Temple